Giacomo Apollonio (1584 in Bassano – 1 December 1654 in Bassano) was an Italian painter of the late-Renaissance and early-Baroque periods.

Born to a daughter of Jacopo Bassano, and trained with his uncles Gerolamo and Giovanni Battista (del Ponte) Bassano. The church of Santa Eulalia in Borso del Grappa has an Apollonio painting of Christ ascending above Saints Giustina, John the Evangelist, and Prosdocimus. Giacomo trained the painters Nicola de' Nicoli and Marcantonio Dordi. His nephew Marcantonio Apollonio (died 1729) is described as a mediocre painter.

References

Museum ULAN entry.

1584 births
1654 deaths
People from Bassano del Grappa
16th-century Italian painters
Italian male painters
17th-century Italian painters
Renaissance painters
Italian Baroque painters